The AMC Gremlin (also American Motors Gremlin) is a subcompact automobile introduced in 1970, manufactured and marketed in a single, two-door body style (1970–1978) by American Motors Corporation (AMC), as well as in Mexico (1974–1983) by AMC's Vehículos Automotores Mexicanos (VAM) subsidiary.

Using a shortened Hornet platform and bodywork with a pronounced kammback tail, the Gremlin was classified as an economy car and competed with the Chevrolet Vega and Ford Pinto, as well as imported cars including the Volkswagen Beetle and Toyota Corolla. The small domestic automaker marketed the Gremlin as "the first American-built import."

The Gremlin reached a total production of 671,475 over a single generation. It was superseded by a restyled and revised variant, the AMC Spirit produced from 1979 through 1983. This was long after the retirement of the Ford Pinto that suffered from stories about exploding gas tanks, as well as the Chevrolet Vega with its rusting bodies and durability problems with its aluminum engine.

History

Origin and design

The idea for the Gremlin began in 1966 when design chief at American Motors, Dick Teague, and stylist Bob Nixon discussed the possibility of a shortened version of AMC's compact car. On an airline flight, Teague's solution, which he said he sketched on an air sickness bag, was to truncate the tail of a Javelin. Bob Nixon joined AMC as a 23-year-old and did the first formal design sketches in 1967 for the car that was to be the Gremlin.

Ford and General Motors were to launch new subcompact cars for 1971, but AMC did not have the financial resources to compete with an entirely new design. Teague's idea of using the pony car Javelin resulted in the AMX-GT concept, first shown at the New York International Auto Show in April 1968. This version did not go into production, but the AMX name was used from 1968 through 1970 on a shortened, two-seat sports car built from the Javelin.

Instead, Bob Nixon, AMC's future Chief of Design, designed the new subcompact based on the automaker's Hornet model, a compact car.

Capitalizing on AMC's advantage as a small car producer, the Gremlin was introduced on April 1, 1970. The April 6, 1970, cover of Newsweek magazine featured a red Gremlin for its article, "Detroit Fights Back: The Gremlin". The car was available as a "base" two-passenger version with no rear seat and a fixed rear window, at a suggested retail price of $1,879, and as a four-seat hatchback with an opening rear window, at $1,959 (US$ in  dollars).

From the front of the car to the B-pillars, the Gremlin was essentially the same as the AMC Hornet. Although it was only fractionally longer than the contemporary Volkswagen Beetle, Time said the length of its hood over the front-mounted engine made "the difference seem considerably more", adding that the car "resembles a sawed-off station wagon, with a long, low hood and swept-up rear, and is faintly reminiscent of the original Studebaker Avanti." As with the Volkswagen, the Gremlin's styling set it apart from other cars. Time said, "like some other cars of less than standard size, the back seat is designed for small children only." The Gremlin's wider stance gave it "a stable, quiet and relatively comfortable ride—for the two front passengers”, for whom, by small-car standards, there was more than average interior width, seat room, and legroom.

The upright design of the tail, which enlarged interior space, was aerodynamically efficient. Later, European and Japanese manufacturers similarly created different body styles on one compact car chassis by extending or curtailing the trunk (e.g. Volkswagen's Jetta and Golf models).

Marketing

Designed and named by Teague to look either "cute or controversial - depending on one's viewpoint ... for many, it seemed perfect for the free-thinking early 1970s." American Motors executives apparently felt confident enough to not worry that the Gremlin name might have negative connotations. Time magazine noted two definitions for gremlin: "Defined by Webster's as 'a small gnome held to be responsible for malfunction of equipment.' American Motors' definition: 'a pal to its friends and an ogre to its enemies.'" The car's cartoon-inspired mascot was marketed for product differentiation and was intended to be memorable to consumers. The Gremlin's hatchback design was also needed to make the car stand out in the competitive marketplace, and according to Teague: "Nobody would have paid it any attention if it had looked like one of the Big Three" automobiles.

AMC promoted the Gremlin as "America's first subcompact". This description overlooks the Nash Metropolitan and the earlier Crosley. The Metropolitan—a subcompact-sized captive import, American-conceived and American-designed for the American market, and built in the UK with a British engine—has a claim to be "America's first subcompact."

AMC marketed the Gremlin as "cute and different," a strategy successful in attracting more than 60 percent of purchasers under the age of 35.

Annual changes (1970–1978)

1970 

The Gremlin debuted in April 1970 with AMC's  I6, a seven main bearing design which produced  as standard equipment, with AMC's  I6 - producing  - as an option. AMC said the Gremlin offered "the best gas mileage of any production car made in America". According to the auto editors of Consumer Guide, it had "an unusually long option list for the era" so owners could have luxury and conveniences typically found in more expensive cars, and these options "came with a much higher profit margin" for the automaker.

As the first of the new domestic subcompact cars, "the Gremlin has been the most talked-about car since its introduction." Sales for the abbreviated model year were 25,300.

Popular Science assigned its editor to the equivalent of one year of driving by conducting a  cross-country road test of a brand new Gremlin, and reported after driving it "without a single problem is an enviable record" and that "we were all impressed with the quality of this vehicle." A nationwide survey based on owners driving their 1970 AMC Gremlins over  conducted by Popular Mechanics concluded that the unique styling attracted many buyers, but economy topped their likes.

1971 

For the 1971 model year the "X" appearance/equipment trim package was introduced as a $300 option on the 4-passenger model and "proved extremely popular." It included body side tape stripes, body color front fascia, slotted road wheels with D70x14 Goodyear Polyglas tires, blackout grille insert, bucket seats, and "X" decals.

The 2-passenger Gremlin version entered into its second and final season. The  I6 engine that was optional for 1970 became standard, while a longer-stroke  version became the option.

1971 Gremlin prices increased slightly (up by $20 to $1,899 for the base model), and sales for this first full model year rose to 53,480.

1972 

All Gremlins received a new body-colored front fascia treatment for 1972. Among many other changes was an available  V8 engine. It was "the muscle car formula of stuffing a big motor in a small car." Even with the lower engine output ratings across the industry, "the V8 Gremlin was a poor-man's Corvette, able to spin its rear tires at will and outrun some larger, more expensive pony cars" and it was "the only real performance car available under $2,200."

The base two-seater model was discontinued, having sold 3,017 units in 18 months. Gremlins also switched from non-synchronized 1st gear manual transmissions to full synchromesh, and the Borg-Warner-sourced automatic transmission was replaced by the Chrysler-designed TorqueFlite. Other minor technical upgrades improved the car's reliability and durability.

American Motors introduced the automobile industry's first 12-month or  bumper-to-bumper warranty, called the "Buyer Protection Plan". Its foundation was an emphasis on quality and durability, improved production by reducing the number of models and increasing the level of standard equipment. The new warranty included an innovative promise to customers that AMC would repair anything wrong with the car (except for tires). Owners were provided with a toll-free number to the company, as well as a free loaner car if a warranty repair took overnight. Numerous production and product improvements would result in fewer warranty claims, better public relations, and greater customer satisfaction and loyalty.

Model year 1972 sales totaled 61,717, a 15% gain over the previous year.

1973 
For the 1973 model year, AMC strengthened bumpers able to withstand a  impact in the front and a  impact in the rear, without any damage to the engine, lights, and safety equipment according to new mandates by the U.S. National Highway Traffic Safety Administration (NHTSA). Optional was a Levi's interior trim package, which included spun nylon upholstery made to look like denim (fire safety regulations prohibited the use of real cotton denim). Details included removable map pockets, burnished copper denim rivets, and red Levi's logo tabs. Rear-seat legroom was increased. The X package received a new tape-striping pattern that kicked up over the Gremlin's rear-wheel flares.

Sales improved to 122,844 units, nearly 30% more than in 1972. A 1973 Gremlin purchased by Consumer Reports was top-rated in a group of six subcompact models tested for the June issue. That car had relatively few sample defects and proved reliable over a long-term test.

1974 

The Arab Oil Embargo of October 1973 came just as the 1974 model year began. AMC improved the Gremlin's back seat. A deeper front fascia made the car appear longer. A larger front bumper was mounted on self-restoring telescoping gas and oil cylinders. Unlike most other designs, the Gremlin did not use a filler panel between the bumper and body. A stronger rear bumper was set lower—front and rear passenger car bumpers were now required by NHTSA to have uniform heights, take angle impacts, and sustain  impacts with no damage. The rear fascia was modified slightly to blend with the design changes. The Gremlin X stripe pattern was given a "hockey stick" look for 1974: the stripes followed the window line as it tapered aft, and swept up now to include four diagonal lines on the wide C-pillar. A new typeface for nameplates was used by AMC for 1974, including on the Gremlin. With the car's 1974 model year extended into November to delay the need to install catalytic converters required by the United States Environmental Protection Agency (EPA) 2004 regulations starting with 1975 models, AMC sold 171,128 1974 Gremlins, an increase of nearly 40% over 1973 and 130% over 1971.

1975 

Changes for the 1975 model year Gremlins included standard electronic ignition developed by Prestolite. All U.S. market Gremlins featured catalytic converters that required the use of unleaded regular-grade fuel. "Unleaded Fuel Only" warnings were placed by the fuel filler and on the fuel gauge. Gremlins with I6 engines and manual transmissions gained a new option, the electrically operated overdrive from Laycock de Normanville. The 0.714:1 "J-type" unit was controlled by a pushbutton at the end of the turn signal stalk. An accelerator pedal kick-down switch provided faster passing when needed. Steel-belted radial tires were now standard on Gremlins with the X package.

American Motors was promoting its economical models covered by the comprehensive "Buyer Protection Plan" warranty, as well as preparing for the launch of the Pacer The automaker was planning to spend half of the entire 1975 advertising budget on the new Pacer. Marketing for the Gremlin included tie-ins with a "Home Value Days" supplement designed to promote 18,500 hardware stores in Popular Science and The Reader's Digest as well as with Colgate-Palmolive's campaign using Willie Mays to "Help Young America" in Jet and Ebony.

The U.S. subcompacts were compared to the new, front-wheel-drive Volkswagen Rabbit that replaced the aging Beetle. The Gremlin had an I6 engine and a three-speed transmission (in contrast to the I4 engines and four-speed transmissions in the other cars) and weighed over  more than the VW Rabbit.

Struggling under stagflation and an inflationary economy, all the domestic subcompact cars' sales slumped compared to the industry's record-breaking 1973 model year. In total, AMC sold 56,011 Gremlins in the (albeit shortened) 1975 model year, a 67% drop. The success of the innovative Pacer launched in mid-February 1975 "severely cut" the sales of both the Gremlin and Hornet models.

1976 

Changes were greater for 1976. Oval headlight bezels replaced the previous circular items. The grille shape became a stretched hexagon and included in its insert two opposing loops stacked atop each other and housing new rounded parking/turn signal lights. Front fenders were taller, with a slight finned effect. A new "Custom" trim line debuted, featuring a striped interior trim called "Potomac", as well as a spare tire cover and other minor details. The A models were given another new striping scheme: the hockey stick-style stripe of the previous year adding a secondary extension that ran from the door handle straight back. The X package was now available only on Custom models. Due to flagging sales, the  V8 engine option (now downgraded to ) was cancelled at midyear, after only 826 installations. (A total of 40,994 Gremlins were equipped with the V8 engine from 1972 until 1976.) A 4-speed manual transmission was made available at midyear. Sales tapered slightly to 52,941 - a decline of 5.5%. The 3-speed manual transmission also had the option of an electric overdrive when in third gear. Overdrive operation was by a push-button on the turn signal stalk. There may have been 600 to 700 of these built.

1977 

1977 changes included redesigned sheet metal for the first time in the Gremlin's now 8-year history: revised hood, shorter front fenders, new bumpers, taller glass tailgate, enlarged taillights, and rear license plate now covering the fuel filler. The front end was shortened by four inches (102 mm) with all-new sheet metal and a crosshatch grille insert. Parking lights reverted to rectangular, and headlights were recessed into square bezels with rounded corners. The new hood had a small "power bulge" at the front. The base model now included carpeting, as well as rocker panel and wheel lip moldings. The "Custom" model was available with a list price of $2,998. The X package returned as a $189 option, with a new striping pattern that ran straight back from the front fenders and crested upward over the rear wheels. Front disc brakes became standard.

At the start of the model year, the Gremlin was available with either the standard  or optional  six-cylinder engines. Both had increased power from updated cylinder heads and two-barrel carburetors. In addition, AMC offered a carbureted four-cylinder engine: a Volkswagen/Audi  inline-four, also used in fuel-injected form in the Porsche 924. It was reserved for the Custom version of the Gremlin because the expense of acquiring the rights to the engine meant that AMC could not afford to make it standard equipment. Of 46,171 Gremlins built for 1977 (13% less than in 1976), 7,558 had the new 2.0 L engine.

1978 

In its final year of 1978, the Gremlin received a number of changes, but customers on a tighter budget could still get a standard six-cylinder base model Gremlin for under US$3,400. A new "Custom" model featured either the four- or six-cylinder engine with a standard four-speed manual transmission and new vinyl bucket seats, wheel lip moldings, and other trim upgrades. Inside the Gremlin there was a revised instrument panel borrowed from the then-new 1978 Concord. The dashboard had high-level ventilation HVAC, radio switchgear within easier reach, and a flat, full-width top. The X's tape striping pattern was revised to match the 1978 Concord Sport package design, with the stripe at the lower body side and curving over the wheel lip.

At mid-season, a GT package became available with a front spoiler and flared wheel openings as on the 1978 AMX. The GT added an aluminum overlay to the instrument panel, was powered by the  I6 as standard, and had a unique striping scheme: a wide tape stripe, outlined by a narrow one, ran back from the front fenders and widened aft of the rear quarter windows. The package also included body-color fender flares and front air dam, as well as body-color bumpers, all of which combined to give the GT a modern, aggressive look. Fewer than 3,000 Gremlin GTs were built.

The Gremlin's body shape had not changed appreciably in its nine years of production, and other more advanced subcompacts, lighter in weight, with more doors, better interiors, and front-wheel drive, had appeared on the market. Gremlin sales for the final year fell 52% to 22,104 units. By the time production ceased, a total of 671,475 Gremlins had been built.

The updated AMC Spirit replaced the Gremlin for the 1979 model year, basically "a Gremlin with conventional styling ... Lovable, sturdy cars are hard to kill."

Performance 

The Gremlin was faster than other subcompacts of the time. Motor Trend magazine recorded zero to 60 mph (0 to 97 km/h) in 12.6 seconds with the  engine. The Ford Pinto and the VW Beetle were in the 18-second range.

Although front-heaviness was generally thought to compromise the handling, Tom McCahill wrote in Mechanix Illustrated that the Gremlin was "fast and easy", with a comparatively stiff ride because of the shortened rear springs. He ran a 232-engined Gremlin with automatic transmission from zero to 60 mph (0 to 97 km/h) in 11.9 seconds, saw  on the Daytona Speedway straightaway, and summarized: "On a dollar for dollar basis, I rate the Gremlin the best American buy of the year".

Car and Driver magazine also recorded 0 to 60 mph in 11.9 seconds with a 232-powered Gremlin.

Automobile Quarterlys article "A Critical Look at the 1973 American Cars" summarized that the basic "Gremlin offers outstanding performance for an economy car and excellent fuel mileage."

When Popular Mechanics magazine tested the car with the Audi four-cylinder engine introduced in 1977, they said its acceleration with a four-speed manual felt "amazingly strong", with 0-60 mph and quarter-mile times one second slower than with the 232 cubic inch straight-six (16 vs. 15, and 21 vs. 20 seconds respectively). The smaller engine produced EPA mileage of  highway and  city.

The Gremlin's body was heavier and stronger than its domestic or imported rivals. The engines were also more powerful than the Gremlin's main domestic and imported competition. The powertrains were smoother and more reliable, and the car had fewer recalls. Its chief import rival was the Volkswagen Beetle, which did not handle as well and got similar gas mileage from about 40% of the Gremlin's horsepower. The same overall size as the Gremlin, it was packaged marginally better. Gremlin designer Richard Teague commented in Motor Trend that to compare the Beetle (whose basic design originated in the late 1930s) to the Gremlin in profile and body design was like "comparing a Ford GT40 to the Hindenburg".

The Gremlin holds the "distinction of offering one of the widest engine ranges of all time—from two liters to five liters."

Randall 401-XR

Randall AMC dealership in Mesa, Arizona, received AMC's endorsement to build  V8 powered Gremlins. The cars started out as 304 cubic inch V8 models from the factory and after Randall's modifications would run 13.90 seconds at 103- in the quarter mile, for $2,995 (US$ in  dollars). Known as the Randall 401-XR (X for Gremlin X, R for Randall), a total of twenty cars were built for the street and one for the strip during 1972, 1973, and 1974. In 2012, the Randalls built a 22nd Continuation Plum 1974 Gremlin 401XR, originally intending to build a few, but built only one. Car Craft magazine tested one with some modifications and achieved  in 12.22 seconds while still remaining a "totally streetable, daily-driver". In 1972, Super Stock magazine had a "Special Gremlin" issue. One of the many venues where Randall's 1972 Gremlin 401XR Super Stock drag car was at the 1972 Winter Nationals.

Competition 

The AMC Gremlin saw action on numerous auto racing venues, including endurance, as well as oval and road racing. Due to their inherent inexpensiveness, strength, and simplicity to modify them for higher performance, many AMC Gremlins were used in drag racing.

In the International Motor Sports Association (IMSA) RS series for compact sedans, Raleigh, North Carolina's "Team Highball", run by Amos Johnson and Bunny Johnson, was the AMC factory-backed team, with Amos Johnson, Whit Diggett, and later, Dennis Shaw driving. The torque of their  6-cylinder Gremlins gave a big advantage on the faster tracks like the Daytona International Speedway, where they were often more than a match for the BMW 2002, Alfa Romeo GTV, Datsun 510, Ford Pinto, Mercury Capri, and Opel Manta. Johnson was the series 1973 co-champion, while independent driver George Alderman took the 1974 title.

Starting in 1970, Wally Booth headed AMC's Pro Stock drag racing efforts. He and other drivers campaigned Gremlins painted in the hash red, white, and blue pattern that AMC had adopted as its corporate race livery. Dick Arons built the engines. The team "transformed the brand's staid grocery-getter reputation from the ground up into that of a genuine performance powerhouse". Wally Booth "was one of the Edelbrock crew's favorite racers".

The rule changes for the 1972 Pro Stock season opened drag racing for smaller cars fitted with small-block engines and AMC was committed to fielding the Gremlin. The first car Booth built was a Gremlin body-in-white, but it was wrecked in a towing accident. In preparation for the 1973 racing season, Booth built a tube chassis Gremlin with the former Penske Racing fabricator, Ron Fournier, but switched to a Hornet body Pro Stock body after realizing that the Gremlin's aerodynamics were limiting top speed during testing at the Milan Dragway in Michigan.

The automaker's involvement in drag racing led to coordination in the development of the Gremlin 401XR. Grant and Mike Randall owners of Randall Rambler/AMC, built a 1972 Gremlin 401XR Drag Car, that they raced at the ARHA Winter Nationals 1972. The Randalls also wrote a high-Performance AMC Engine Tuning guide as well as the "Randall Rambler & Jeep Speed Bible."

Three factory Pro-Stock 1972 Gremlin drag racers were campaigned around the nation. One was driven by Rich LaMont and sponsored by radio station 99 WIBG in Philadelphia, PA.

At the 2006 World Power Wheelstanding Championships (not a race, but a "wheelie" contest), Brian Ambrosini's specially modified 1974 Gremlin took second place.

The body of the Gremlin was widely used by NASCAR paved and dirt modified stock car teams in the northeastern U.S. and elsewhere from the 1970s to the early 1990s. It was believed that Gremlin's long roof with its rear kick-up provided aerodynamic advantages over the more commonly used Pinto and Vega bodies. Lenny Podbielski was "a major player in late 1970s Speedbowl action" and the Gremlin-bodied machines he raced were "some of the prettiest cars of the era".

Other markets

Canada 

American Motors built an assembly plant in Brampton, Ontario in 1961 for production of motor vehicles for the Canadian market as well as for the United States. The plant built and offered almost all AMC vehicles through the 1960s, allowing AMC to take advantage of the Canada–United States Automotive Products Agreement established between the two countries in 1965. By 1969 production at the Brampton Assembly had grown to such a size that AMC had the plant producing vehicles for the eastern half of the American continent while Kenosha produced vehicles for the western half of the continent. The plant ceased building the Ambassador after 1968 and imported the Javelin and later Matador from the United States but continued to build the Gremlin and Hornet throughout the 1970s.

With Canada moving to the Metric system during the 1970s, late model Gremlins were built with their speedometers reading in kilometers per hour.

Mexico 

Vehiculos Automotores Mexicanos (VAM) manufactured Gremlins in Mexico under license and partial ownership (38% equity share) by AMC. Although the Gremlin was introduced to the U.S. and Canadian markets in 1970, VAM continued assembling its version of the Hornet still bearing the name Rambler American as its smallest, least expensive car until 1974. The fact that VAM already had three lines of products (the top limit permitted by legislation) from 1968 through 1973 made it impossible for the Gremlin to be offered. It was until the discontinuation of the Javelin line in 1973 that free space was available for Gremlin production, making 1974 its year of debut.

The 1974 Gremlin was the third VAM car not to bear the Rambler name since the 1968 Javelin and the 1972 Classic (Matador in the U.S.) models. Moreover, the Mexican market continued to use the Gremlin model name for VAM's version of the AMC Spirit sedan from 1979 through 1983, several years after the Gremlin nameplate was withdrawn in the U.S. market.

The VAM cars had trim, interiors, and model names that differed from the equivalent AMC-made models. All engines built by VAM were of AMC design, modified to deal with Mexico's lower octane gasoline and higher altitudes. The VAM Gremlin was the only car line of its time not to be available with VAM's  version of AMC's I6, due to the economy market segment focus of the cars. This is exactly the opposite case as the AMC Gremlin, which was offered with the option of a 304 V8. The three-speed manual transmission with overdrive, the four-speed manual transmission, the V8 and Audi four-cylinder engines were never available. Trim levels and versions like the two-seater, the Levis Gremlin, the Gremlin Custom, and the Gremlin GT were also never available.

1974 
The introductory 1974 Gremlins became unique by incorporating the front clip of the 1974 U.S. AMC Hornet models. VAM never attempted to hide the relationship between the two models, which never harmed the sales or image of either model and was favored by the public. The launch of the Gremlin in Mexico also meant the resurrection of the  I6 engine that was discontinued in 1972. The engine was practically the same as in its final year except for a slightly lower compression ratio (8.3:1 instead of 8.5:1). The advertised output was still the same at 145 gross horsepower at 4,400 revolutions per minute and was restricted to one-barrel carburetors. In contrast, since 1973 all VAM-based Hornets had the  six as the standard and only engine. VAM Gremlins were basic economy cars with a full synchromesh manual 3-speed transmission, heavy-duty clutch, manual four-wheel drum brakes, manual steering, front sway bar, 3.31:1 rear gear ratio, rigid four-bladed cooling fan, collapsible steering column with anti-theft lock, base steering wheel, side marker and hazard lights, column-mounted shifters only, two-tone padded dashboard with silver-colored front surfaces, electric wipers and washers, monaural AM radio, cigarette lighter, front and rear ashtrays, locking glovebox, folding bench seats, two-point front seatbelts, flip-open rear side vents, roof rack, full carpeting with driver's side rubber mat, padded sun visors, sound-insulating cardboard-type headliner, dual coat hooks and round dome light. Factory options for 1974 included a column-mounted automatic transmission, power steering, power drum brakes, heater, parcel shelf, light group, remote-controlled driver and passenger side outside mirrors, sports steering wheel, bright molding package, wheel trim rings, and heavy-duty cooling. All VAM Gremlins used AMC's three-pod instrument cluster from the domestic-built Hornet with a blank in the third gauge position from the factory, which could be equipped with a universal tachometer or clock as dealership options. The introductory year production was 2,137.

1975 
The 1975 Gremlin models were upgraded, and along with the improvements to the larger car lines VAM took 9% of the Mexican market. VAM Gremlin interiors now featured individual folding front seats with low backs and new door panels, the "two-tone" dashboard with silver-painted front surfaces was replaced by a color-keyed unit, and a new fuel economy gauge was standard on the third space of the instrument cluster. Manual front disk brakes and electronic ignition were among the mechanical upgrades, while the compression ratio of the engine was dropped to 7.6:1. Both transmissions now came only with a floor-mounted shifter. VAM Gremlins ordered with automatic transmissions now included a heater and power steering at no charge. The exterior featured a variation of AMC's "hockey stick" side decal and a new design for headlight bezels, grille, and parking lights at the front end that AMC originally developed for its Hornet models. Production doubled to over 4,200 VAM Gremlins.

1976 
The Gremlin X version was added in 1976 as a separate model rather than an optional package. The X models included VAM's larger  I6, a 6000 RPM tachometer, sports steering wheel, 7.00X14 radial tires, Hurst linkage with T-shaped shifter for the manual transmissions, courtesy lights under the parcel shelf, heater, power steering, tinted windshield, bright molding package (drip rails, wheel arches, rocker panels), wheel trim rings, and an in-house two-color rally stripe that was unique to the Mexican market. The 1976 VAM Gremlin X also came with an interior featuring the "Navajo" pattern cloth upholstery that was optional on AMC's Pacer DL models built for the Canadian and U.S. markets. The base VAM Gremlin now also included luxurious seating with a center armrest that was never available in the U.S. models. Due to the debut of the Gremlin X and its sportier focus, the base Gremlin switched back to the standard column-mounted shifters for either transmission, but keeping the individual seat configuration. Both versions included revised gauges with a 160 km/h speedometer, new side panel designs, longer folding sun visors, and a styled round dome light lens. Sales for 1976 increased to over 6,000 units.

1977 
Starting with the 1977 models, all VAM Gremlins were powered by the  I6 regardless of trim level. The exterior featured the shorter new front end clip and rear end treatment as did the U.S. models. The 1977 Gremlin X model included a new digital tachometer and three-point retractable seatbelts, as well as new in-house VAM designs for the seats. The sporty side decal was slightly revised. The seatbelts on the base Gremlin were also changed to three-point units, which were fixed and lacked retractable mechanisms. The option list was expanded with the possibility of ordering a factory air conditioning system for the first time in the VAM line, which was available only in the X model. The previously optional dealership-offered universal air conditioning system remained available for the base model. The VAM Gremlin X (along with the 1977-1979 American ECD, Concord DL four-door equivalent) would be the only VAM car with the 258 I6 engines to be available with a factory air conditioning system, as all other VAM models with it would be  units. Around 6,800 VAM Gremlins were sold during 1977.

1978 
Only a few changes were made to the 1978 VAM Gremlin. The dashboard design was from the new U.S. market Concord being restricted to the unit with black surfaces only (no wood imitation or brushed aluminum versions). For the Gremlin X, there was a new VAM logo on the steering wheel horn button, smaller pointy volcano hubcaps with bright exposed lug nuts, and a new full-length bodyside decal incorporated the "Gremlin X" logo on the rear quarter panel. The sporty model also got the set of four bumper guards as standard equipment. The base model got another set of new hubcaps with exposed lug nuts, but with a flat top instead. Production fell just below 6,000 VAM Gremlins.

Second Generation 

VAM Gremlins used the updated body design of the U.S. and Canadian market AMC Spirit two-door sedan, as well as VAM versions of the Spirit Liftback, called the American GT and the Rally AMX. At the time, cars in Mexico took longer to be perceived as outdated than in the US and since the VAM Gremlin came to the public until 1974 instead of 1970, it was still relatively fresh among the Mexican buyers. Aside from this, the model kept a positive image throughout its whole run. It exceeded VAM's sales expectations in its first years. The company originally considered it a temporary low-volume model that would eventually be replaced by the upcoming Pacer model. In the end, the Gremlin stood and became VAM's all-time second best-selling line after the American. For these reasons VAM decided to keep the Gremlin name for the upcoming Spirit sedan model, being a testament to the very favorable image VAM cars in general held in Mexico. This was the third time a case like this happened within the company with Rebel and Matador models keeping the name Rambler Classic and the Hornet the Rambler American name.

Australia 

AMC exported a fully built Gremlin to its Australian partner, Australian Motor Industries (AMI) of Port Melbourne, Victoria in 1970 for evaluation purposes. (AMI assembled and marketed other AMC models since 1961.) The evaluation model was painted in AMC's "Big Bad Orange" and was converted from left-hand drive to right-hand drive by Sydney Toyota dealer Bill Buckle Pty Ltd. The car featured AMC's  six-cylinder engine and a three-speed manual transmission. The car was presented at the 1970 Sydney Motor Show to gauge interest and test the market.

The car was featured on the front cover of the November 1970 issue of Australia's top motoring magazine, Wheels magazine. The magazine's review pointed to the likelihood that the "local content" requirements would force the price up to that of the high-priced, Australian-assembled Hornet, and probably price the car out of the market.

For marketing purposes, it was branded as a "Rambler Gremlin" in keeping with the use of the Rambler marque for all AMC vehicles sold in Australia despite that Rambler as a brand was retired in the United States at the end of the 1969 model year. However, no Gremlin models were put into production in Australia.

Right-hand-drive Gremlins were imported into Australia by U.S. servicemen.

Switzerland 
Beginning in 1970 Zurich automotive importer J.H Heller AG began importing American Motors vehicles, specifically the Javelin, Gremlin and later the Pacer. Swiss market vehicles were shipped from AMC's Canadian plant.

United Kingdom 
American Motors vehicles were exported to the United Kingdom during the 1960s and 1970s and sold by Rambler Motors (A.M.C.) Ltd in London with dealers in London, Yorks, Kent, and Worcester. While earlier models such as the Rambler Classic, Rebel, Ambassador, and Matador had been exported as completed factory right-hand-drive vehicles, only left-hand-drive Gremlins were exported to the United Kingdom. A U.K company called C.T. Wooler, in Andover, Hampshire had been in the business for a long time converting LHD cars to RHD and entered into an agreement with AMC to convert AMC vehicles. C.T Wooler converted Gremlins as well as AMC Pacers and Jeeps.

Hurst Rescue System 1 

Between 1972 and 1974, Hurst Performance marketed "a highway safety vehicle" for emergency services, as well as a compact alternative to trucks for motorsport race tracks. The "Hurst Rescue System 1" was based on the AMC Gremlin and designed to quickly assist vehicle extrication of crash victims. The vehicle came with the "Hurst Rescue Tool", commonly known as "The Jaws of Life", winch, stretcher, as well as firefighting and first aid supplies. The vehicle also included push bumpers and a 25-gallon water tank. The price for this fully equipped rescue vehicle was between $11,000 to $13,000.

Police
A 1975 Gremlin was used as an experimental police vehicle by the Houston Police Department's Traffic Bureau, but this did not result in fleet orders.

Experimental cars 
The Gremlin proved a popular testbed for experiments with alternative fuels. Many universities converted them to run on natural gas, hydrogen, and electric power.

Hydrogen 
In 1972 University of California, Los Angeles researchers won a nationwide Urban Vehicle Design Competition when they modified a 1972 AMC Gremlin to run on hydrogen. The lessons learned are still useful today. The engine was a converted Ford  V8 noted for its volumetric efficiency. Tests indicated that the car would not only meet the scheduled 1976 vehicle United States emission standards, but also actually emit slightly cleaner air than it took in. As part of the 1972 Urban Vehicle Design Competition, UCLA engineering students also enlarged the side glass area above the rear wheels for improved visibility, designed a roll cage which projected through the Gremlin's roof to double as a roof rack, and designed 5 MPH bumpers with an environmentally-friendly energy-absorbing popcorn core, covered with a recycled-tire tread surface. In 1984, UCLA's first hydrogen-powered car was sold for one dollar to the William F. Harrah Automobile Museum in Reno, Nevada. In 2010, the car was available on an auction site.

Alternative fuels 
Other experiments used AMC Gremlins.

The broadest range of fuel tests were conducted by the United States Department of Energy (DOE) labs in Bartlesville, Oklahoma. Engineers estimated the performance and fuel economy of 1977 Gremlin Xs operating on ordinary gasoline, a variety of wide boiling range fuels (naphtha, kerosene, etc.), as well as two alcohols, ethanol and methanol.

Electric 

The Electric Fuel Propulsion Company (EFP) of Ferndale, Michigan, produced a number of electric cars including the AMC Gremlin based, two-passenger X-144. Introduced in 1973 it featured a  direct current motor fueled by a 144-volt cobalt-lead storage batteries designed to reduce the formation of harmful gases during recharging, as well as a regular 12-volt battery to operate the cars lights, horn, and heater blower.

Inventor "Cotton" Whatley of Wichita Falls, Texas, offered an unknown number of modified electric Gremlins for sale through various dealerships between 1973 and 1978.

Exhibition 
Engineers at Coleman Products Corporation in Coleman, Wisconsin, created a non-drivable plexiglas Gremlin as a demonstrator of the placement and function of electrical wiring harnesses.

Concept Gremlins

Gremlin Voyager 
In 1972 AMC developed a prototype "Gremlin Voyager" with a slide out rear panel called "Grem-Bin". The car was a production Gremlin with a proposed "shelf" design to make cargo loading easier.

XP prototype 

In 1974 a production car was modified and dubbed the Gremlin XP prototype. It has a larger glass hatchback and additional side quarter windows. A pronounced crease started from the mid-body section and wraps over the roof while the rear quarter panels feature bulges around the wheel well openings. The rear panel has a recessed and blacked-out area with four lights. The design of the concept car improved visibility around the Gremlin's original wide C-pillar.

G/II prototype 
Another 1974 Gremlin was modified with a front end from the Hornet. The concept car received a special grille, but the most radical design feature was its fastback roofline. This concept car turned out to be similar to the Gremlin's replacement, the liftback Spirit model introduced for the 1979 model year.

Concept 80 
In 1977 American Motors presented six show cars to illustrate the automaker's commitment to smaller, fuel-efficient vehicles for the 1980s. Three of them, the "Concept I", "Concept II", and "Concept Grand Touring" represented new subcompact designs.
 The Concept I car combined a "wedge-design" with a short hood, low body beltline, steeply raked windshield, and expanded glass area. The front featured a mesh grille with "rally-type" parking lights and rectangular headlamps. The rear end was squared off featuring large rear quarter windows to eliminate blind spots. The rear panel incorporated a characteristic continental tire bulge.
The Concept II design was another Gremlin replacement proposal featuring integral soft bumpers, and headlamps concealed by flush sliding doors. A pronounced center structural "Targa-band" was designed to add strength to the roof. The squared-off rear end featured a glass hatchback.
The Concept Grand Touring was a larger luxury hatchback designed for four passengers. The interior was appointed in leather and corduroy upholstery and luxury appointments with deep-pile carpeting. The front end featured a "venturi" grille with rally-type lights. The rear side windows were "opera" recessed and surrounded by a vinyl cover that ran over the roof's rear quarter. The Concept GT car had genuine wire wheels.

Design elements from the AMC's show cars "Concept II" and "Concept GT" were incorporated into the Gremlin's replacement, the AMC Spirit that was introduced in 1979.

Production history and reception 
The 1970s were one of the most volatile periods in the history of the automobile industry which is renowned for its ups and downs. A total of 671,475 Gremlins were sold in the United States and Canada, making it the most popular single generation body style/chassis produced by AMC (other models, such as the Rambler and even Hornet, have higher production numbers, but consisted of more than one chassis design and body style in the case of the Rambler, multiple body styles for the Hornet).

A book about the popular history of the 1970s introduces it as the decade of "pet rocks, shag carpets, platform shoes, and the AMC Gremlin." It is among the cars that people who were in high school in the late 1970s and early 1980s would be familiar with because it was one of the first cars they drove and among most often seen in student parking lots. Kiplinger's personal finance magazine, Changing Times, listed the AMC Gremlin as first among the best subcompact used cars as "selected by top mechanics for good value, good service." Five years after the Gremlin's introduction, the mechanics liked the six-cylinder engine and most preferred automatic transmission. Comments included, "I have one. It's the greatest. I own one with a 304 V-8 engine. Have no trouble outside of normal maintenance."

During the early 1970s American cars "are remembered far more often for their power than their style, and ... throughout the decade, the character of cars became blurred. Only a handful of cars had real personalities...." the AMC Gremlin was one of them, "a pioneering hatchback". According to Tom and Ray Magliozzi, "it's easy to criticize this car now, because just about any car from the early '70s would look bad next to today's cars. They had no fuel injection, no independent suspension, no air bags, no anti-lock brakes, no nothing! But compared with the other cars of its era, the Gremlin wasn't bad."

Officially discontinued after the 1978 model year, the Gremlin was restyled, including a new model that featured a sloping liftback for 1979 and the model line renamed the AMC Spirit. This restyled continuation of the familiar chopped-tail two-door and the new hatch coupe caused sales to increase to 52,478 units for 1979. The original "Kammback" body style continued in production until 1982 as the Spirit Sedan with larger rear side windows. The basic design was also used for the small AMC Eagle Kammback in 1981 and 1982.

American Motors lacked the funds to come up with a separate platform for a sub-compact car, so it did something different with an existing model, and "although car snobs make fun of the chop-tailed Gremlin, it was a huge sales hit." The authors of the book 365 Cars You Must Drive "that any self-respecting auto enthusiast just has to know and experience from the driver's seat" describe that "driving a Gremlin isn't about the drive; it's about being seen in one, making a statement that you dig the mid-1970s, and also wouldn't be caught dead in something normal." An article published by Time in 2007 included the Gremlin as one of "The 50 Worst Cars of All Time", describing it as an AMC Hornet with the rear end whacked off, and criticizing its exterior proportions, with a long low snout, long front overhang, and a truncated tail, "like the tail snapped off a salamander".

In 2007, Popular Science magazine included the  AMC Gremlin as one of six historic cars that took "Small Steps to a Smart Future" in a special issue about the "Future of the Car: Efficiency".

Future U.S. Presidents
Two former U.S. presidents drove AMC Gremlins during their younger days.

"Bill Clinton drove the back roads of Northwest Arkansas in his green AMC Gremlin" during his 1974 campaign for the only attempt he made for a seat in the United States Congress.

An AMC Gremlin with a Levi interior was owned by the George H. W. Bush family and driven by George W. Bush in 1973 while getting his Master of Business Administration (MBA) degree.

Collectibility 

Scarcity, and the fact that it is a 1970s car, makes the Gremlin collectible, and it has a following among old car hobbyists and collectors of historic vehicles. In some cases, the Gremlin enjoys "a cult-like following in today's collectible car market". In 2007, Business Week reported that 1970s cars such as the Gremlin were increasingly attractive to buyers, and an insurance provider for collector-car owners reported that values were rising at that time.

In light of rising gasoline prices, the Gremlin offers a relatively economical alternative to muscle cars and the more massive American cars of its era-especially for buyers leaning toward the eccentric. AMC said the Gremlin got "the best gas mileage of any production car made in America", and its  gas tank allowed  or more between fill-ups.

Scarcity makes any Gremlin in good condition worth preserving as a unique piece of automotive history. Original Gremlins with the V8 engine, X package models, Levi's trim, and also the 1978 GT versions, are the most sought-after and command higher prices. By 2019, the cars described as gaining legitimacy as a collector car and a Gremlin winning the Platinum Pick Judge's Award and the Concours Gold awards at the 2018 Muscle Car and Corvette Nationals.

Gremlins share numerous parts and components with other AMC models especially service and mechanical replacements are available. There are reproduction parts, but trim pieces for a restoration such as a grille can be more difficult. The Gremlin's original low price and throwaway nature makes good ones fairly scarce today. Many were chopped up during the late 1970s and the 1980s to make dirt-track racers. The body of choice on the dirt circuit was the Gremlin and AMC Eagle. The subcompact bodies fit Modified chassis and of special interest was the Gremlin's slab top and sides with a contour that was easy to duplicate in sheet metal.

Over the years, some owners have converted the economy-versions of Gremlins into home-built "muscle cars" because any AMC engine up to the  "just drops right in".

Hot Wheels model
Hot Wheels designer Paul Tam created a "bizarre but beautifully rendered model" of a Gremlin with six wheels, called "Open Fire", with the extra pair of wheels under a large, exposed metal engine. Other than the engine, extra wheels, and elongated hood, "the Open Fire retains many accurate styling details of AMC's quirky 1970s econocar. Later on, in the Flying Colors range, Hot Wheels made the Gremlin Grinder: A rear-jacked Gremlin with a huge open engine that was produced through the mid-1970s in either green or chrome. The last one was a stockcar or rally car custom version of the Gremlin that was first made in the early 1980s and is still popular today, "The Greased Gremlin".

See also
Nebraska v. One 1970 2-Door Sedan Rambler (Gremlin)

Notes

References

External links 

 An article about the AMC Gremlin
 The Best and Worst Subcompact, the AMC Gremlin
 Data, information, and resources by Gremlin X com
 
 
 AMC Rambler Club
 American Motors Owners Association

Gremlin
Hatchbacks
Rear-wheel-drive vehicles
Subcompact cars
Cars introduced in 1970
Electric vehicles introduced in the 20th century
Hydrogen cars
Cars powered by longitudinal 4-cylinder engines
Cars discontinued in 1983